Ya cai  is a pickled vegetable originating from the Sichuan province, China. It is made from the upper stems of a variety of mustard green. Ya Cai is more pungent than the similar zha cai.

See also
Tianjin preserved vegetable
Zha cai
Suan cai
Pao cai
Meigan cai

References

External links 
 fuchsiadunlop.com
 Sohbet
 Zha Cai Preserved Mustard Tuber: Ya Cai's Sichuan Sister

Chinese pickles
Sichuan cuisine
Fermented foods
Pickles
Stem vegetables